Beaucoup Fish is the fifth album by Underworld, released in 1999. Following the huge success of the single "Born Slippy .NUXX" from its use in the film Trainspotting, Beaucoup Fish was Underworld's most anticipated release. It spawned several successful singles, including "Push Upstairs", "Jumbo" and "Moaner", which was previously used in the film Batman & Robin.

It is the last studio album to feature Darren Emerson, who departed in 2001, and the third album by the techno/house orientated version of Underworld which became active in about 1991/1992 (tracks were being released around this time under the names Lemon Interupt and Underworld).

The album was remastered and re-released on 25 August 2017 with deluxe and super-deluxe expanded editions.

Overview
Beaucoup Fish was released after the successful single "Born Slippy .NUXX"; a single that began to define Underworld's signature sound of stream of consciousness lyrics, anthemic melodies and driving beats and rhythms. Lead single "Push Upstairs", with its energetic piano melody, exemplified this new sound.

The album's working title was Tonight Matthew, I'm Going to be Underworld, inspired by the famous catchphrase "Tonight [host name], I'm going to be...", used on the British celebrity impersonation TV programme Stars in Their Eyes. The title was changed to Beaucoup Fish ("beaucoup" being French for "much"), on the basis that the tongue-in-cheek title would be incomprehensible to listeners outside of the United Kingdom. The current title comes from a sampled voice used in "Jumbo", of an American from the Southern United States using the regional pronunciation, "bookoo fish."

"King of Snake" features a tape-edited guitar intro titled "Shudder", leading into a lively house track, before fading into sampled dialogue about the blood sport of snake baiting. "Skym" is a minimal ballad, inspired by This Mortal Coil and featuring little more than a solo keyboard and light piano chords over Karl Hyde's vocals, while "Bruce Lee" has more akin to rock music than trance. Beaucoup Fish also features a downtempo re-imagining of "Push Upstairs", playfully titled "Push Downstairs"; only the vocal track is kept between the two. "Moaner", a song featured in the 1997 film Batman & Robin, is presented on Beaucoup Fish in its slightly edited soundtrack album version, previously available on an Underworld CD single.

"Push Upstairs" and second single "Jumbo" were both hits on the dance charts and in clubs. Beaucoup Fish was well-received critically (one review calling it "electronica's The Dark Side of the Moon") and remains Underworld's most successful album, with over two million copies sold.

Artwork
The art for Beaucoup Fish was once again designed by Tomato, the art firm that Underworld is a part of. Each page of the liner notes featured a stylized shape in a large blue field. The shapes used are a circle for CD; a square for vinyl; and an elongated rectangle for MiniDisc and cassette formats.

Due to delays, the packaging incorrectly lists 1998 as the release year.

Critical reception

Beaucoup Fish was well received by music critics and it continues to be Underworld's best selling album to date. It has a score of 79/100 on Metacritic based on 20 reviews, which indicates "generally favorable reviews".

John Bush from AllMusic gave the album 4 out of 5 stars saying "the trio is still the best at welding obtuse songcraft onto an uncompromising techno framework and making both sound great".

David Browne from Entertainment Weekly gave the album an A rating stating that Beaucoup Fish "gently tweaks the naysayers by demonstrating how many more places this music can wander, how it can grow and reinvent itself. Albums like this (and Fatboy Slim's kaleidoscopic You've Come a Long Way, Baby) are comparable to Lauryn Hill's recent work in the way they make an overly familiar style of music seem vital again. In its own lush, detached manner, Beaucoup Fish is the rebirth of the cool."

John Wojtowicz from The Village Voice gave it a very favourable review saying it is "A shiny little appliance that fragments its 11 tracks into nearly as many subgenres, doing away with the seamless sprawl of their earlier records".

Rolling Stone gave it 3.5 stars out of 5 saying that "Their specialty is an undulating trance throb that shimmers with shades of rock, contemporary symphonics, dub, disco, house, spoken word, whatever. The result still sounds like Underworld, and the fiftieth play sounds better than the fifth".

NME gave the album 8/10 saying that "Beaucoup Fish is a pure, seamless flow, pinned together with trance-techno beats that hark back to classic Detroit house and early Underworld singles like 'Cowgirl' and 'Spikee'" and also adding that "There are rare moments when even the longest albums feel like they should go on forever: this, emphatically, is one of them".
 Spin (4/99, pp. 157–158) - 7 (out of 10) - "...the British trio hit on a formula that mixes  and gibberish in just the right proportions..."
 Q (4/99, p. 107) - 3 Stars (out of 5) - "...Beaucoup Fish finds them continuing down an individualistic path as they pull in strands from electronic influences such as Kraftwerk...Giorgio Moroder...and Yello..."
 Magnet (4/99, pp. 81–82) - "...Rather than adopt the happy faces of house, the saintly roar of modern minimalist/classical, the bugged-out rhythms of drum 'n' bass or the sloped dope of dub, the first great album of '99 revels in all these styles....[Underworld] seems to be funkin' for nirvana..."
 Muzik (1/00, p. 69) - "A brutal, bruising take on the band's unique techno template....the melodies were infectious as ever. Trance tunes, swirling basslines and stupendous piano chuggers..."
 CMJ (4/12/99, p. 3) - "...showcases a more mature, album-oriented Underworld, travelling from over-the-top club maelstroms to ominous, gothic ballads to choppy, experimental rap..."
Mojo (03/99, p. 84) - "...BEAUCOUP FISH proves that the real deal with electronic music is not that it is fast and crazy....but allows for perfect recall of sounds and moments....music like Underworld's can have a texture as rich, emotive and individual as memory itself."

Accolades 
 Muzik (1/00, p. 69) - Ranked #10 in Muzik's "Albums of the Year '99"
 CMJ (1/10/00, p. 5) - Ranked #14 in CMJ's "Top 30 Editorial Picks [for 1999]."
 Mojo (1/00, p. 30) - Ranked #18 in Mojo Magazine's "Best of 1999"

2017 reissue

In 2017 the album was reissued, with expanded 2-LP vinyl and 4-CD editions. Pitchforks Philip Sherburne dismissed the two remix CDs as "mainly of interest to collectors" and the alternate takes as "not much more essential" in an otherwise positive review. Chris Todd of The Line of Best Fit similarly pans the extra discs, but calls the original album "weirdly brilliant."

Track listing

4-CD Super Deluxe Edition (2017)

Charts

Weekly charts

Certifications and sales

References

1999 albums
Underworld (band) albums
Junior Boy's Own albums
V2 Records albums